Anthony Gerald Kelly (born 1 October 1964) is an English former footballer who played mainly in central midfield.

A former Liverpool trainee, he moved from non-league Prescot Cables to Wigan Athletic in 1984. The club's Player of the Year in 1985, he also helped Wigan to victory in the 1985 Football League Trophy Final. Sold on to Stoke City in 1986 for a £80,000 fee, he was moved on to West Bromwich Albion for £60,000 a year later. Loaned out to Chester City and Colchester United, he was transferred to Shrewsbury Town in January 1989 for a £30,000 fee. Two years and more than 100 games later, he was sold to Bolton Wanderers for £100,000. A popular player at Bolton, he helped the club to win promotion out of the Second Division in 1992–93. Released in 1994, he had brief spells at Port Vale, Millwall, Wigan Athletic, Peterborough United, Altrincham and Sligo Rovers, before he retired in 1997.

Career

Wigan Athletic
Kelly began his career as an apprentice at Liverpool, before joining non-league Prescot Cables in 1983. He returned to the Football League in January 1984, signing for Third Division Wigan Athletic. He made just over 100 appearances for Wigan, and was voted Player of the Year in 1985, after he scored in a 3–1 victory over Brentford in the Football League Trophy Final at Wembley. The club missed out on promotion in 1985–86 after finishing one point behind third-place Derby County.

Stoke City
He moved on to Second Division Stoke City in April 1986, as manager Mick Mills paid out a fee of £80,000. However Mills and Kelly did not enjoy a happy relationship, and Mills ordered Kelly to lose weight not long after his arrival at the Victoria Ground. He still played 43 games for the "Potters" in 1986–87, scoring four goals, before he was sold to Ron Saunders' West Bromwich Albion for £60,000 in July 1987.

West Bromwich Albion
Ron Atkinson replaced Saunders as manager in September 1987, and so Kelly's impact at The Hawthorns was limited in 1987–88. He instead had successive loan outings with Chester City and Colchester United in 1988. At Chester he was reunited with Harry McNally, the man who had signed him at Wigan; however he only played five league games for the "Seals". At Colchester he was signed by Steve Foley on 24 October, and scored two goals in twenty games for Colchester in the 1988–89 season, as the club struggled at the foot of the Fourth Division. He was substituted at half-time by Jock Wallace in United's match at York City on 21 January and left the ground without saying goodbye to his teammates, ending his loan spell at Layer Road.

Shrewsbury Town
In January 1989, Shrewsbury Town manager Ian McNeill secured Kelly's services for £30,000. Just as with Wigan some years previous, he scored 15 goals in 101 Third Division appearances, however this time after two years he was sold on to Phil Neal's Bolton Wanderers for £100,000.

Bolton Wanderers
He established himself in the first team in 1991–92, and his consistent performances led to him being named on the PFA Team of the Year. He continued to be a first team regular under new manager Bruce Rioch, and helped the "Trotters" to win promotion out of the Second Division as runners-up in 1992–93, before leaving the club at the end of the 1993–94 campaign.

In three years with Bolton, Kelly became a firm favourite with the fans, who nicknamed him Zico in homage to Kelly's footballing style, despite his (at times) obvious weight and fitness problems. He was a cult figure with the fans during his stay at Burnden Park and was a key figure in the exciting team that Bruce Rioch built, as Bolton rose from Third Division obscurities to FA Cup 'giant killings' and pushing at the door of the newly formed Premier League. In total he amassed over 100 league appearances for the club before September 1994, when at age of 30 he was given a free transfer to Port Vale.

Later career
He did not find success at Vale Park, despite finding the net against Notts County, and instead moved on to Millwall later in 1994. Kelly struggled to regain his form and fitness, and after two games for the "Lions" he returned to former club Wigan Athletic, before signing for Peterborough United. He played 13 league games for United, before returning to Wigan in 1995, and finally dropping out of the Football League as he joined non-league Altrincham in February 1996. In 1997, he enjoyed a spell in the League of Ireland with Sligo Rovers under Jimmy Mullen; Kelly scored his only league goal for the club on his debut; he made a total of 17 appearances for Sligo before retiring.

Post-retirement
In 2008, Kelly rejoined Bolton Wanderers as Fans Liaison Officer. Like his former teammate John McGinlay, Kelly is a 'converted' Bolton fan and has a weekly column in The Bolton News where he gives an insight into recent events at the Wanderers. He now also coaches Bolton Wanderers' U18s alongside David Lee, Kelly's former teammate. In a September 2008 poll of Bolton fans, Kelly was voted the 34th greatest player to ever don a Bolton shirt. Kelly regularly takes part in charity football events at BWFC.

Personal life
Kelly is the uncle of Joey Barton.

Career statistics
Source:

A.  The "Other" column constitutes appearances and goals in the Anglo-Italian Cup, Football League Trophy and Full Members Cup.

Honours
Individual
Wigan Athletic Player of the Year: 1985
PFA Team of the Year (Third Division): 1991–92

Wigan Athletic
Football League Trophy: 1985

Bolton Wanderers
Football League Second Division second-place promotion: 1992–93

References

1964 births
Living people
Footballers from Liverpool
English footballers
Association football midfielders
Prescot Cables F.C. players
Bolton Wanderers F.C. players
Wigan Athletic F.C. players
Shrewsbury Town F.C. players
West Bromwich Albion F.C. players
Chester City F.C. players
Colchester United F.C. players
Port Vale F.C. players
Millwall F.C. players
Stoke City F.C. players
Peterborough United F.C. players
Altrincham F.C. players
English expatriate footballers
Expatriate association footballers in the Republic of Ireland
English expatriate sportspeople in Ireland
Sligo Rovers F.C. players
English Football League players
National League (English football) players
Northern Premier League players
League of Ireland players
Association football coaches
Bolton Wanderers F.C. non-playing staff